Iva is a town in Anderson County, South Carolina, United States. The population was 1,218 at the 2010 census.

Geography
Iva is located in southern Anderson County at  (34.307159, -82.664001).

Education
Public education in Iva is administered by Anderson School District 3, which operates Iva Elementary and Crescent High School.

Iva has a public library, a branch of the Anderson County Library System.

Demographics

2020 census

As of the 2020 United States census, there were 1,015 people, 514 households, and 349 families residing in the town.

2000 census
As of the census of 2000, there were 1,156 people, 501 households, and 319 families residing in the town. The population density was 1,286.1 people per square mile (495.9/km). There were 580 housing units at an average density of 645.3 per square mile (248.8/km). The racial makeup of the town was 93.43% White, 6.31% African American, 0.09% Native American, 0.09% from other races, and 0.09% from two or more races. Hispanic or Latino of any race were 0.09% of the population.

There were 501 households in Iva, out of which 25.0% had children under the age of 18 living with them, 44.7% were married couples living together, 12.4% had a female householder with no husband present, and 36.3% were non-families. 33.9% of all households were made up of individuals, and 15.8% had someone living alone who was 65 years of age or older. The average household size was 2.20 and the average family size was 2.77.

In the town, the population was spread out, with 21.2% under the age of 18, 7.1% from 18 to 24, 25.0% from 25 to 44, 21.8% from 45 to 64, and 24.9% who were 65 years of age or older. The median age was 42 years. For every 100 females, there were 84.7 males. For every 100 females age 18 and over, there were 79.0 males.

The median income for a household in the town was $23,333, and the median income for a family was $34,432. Males had a median income of $25,682 versus $21,731 for females. The per capita income for the town was $14,756. About 8.5% of families and 15.2% of the population were below the poverty line, including 14.2% of those under age 18 and 22.6% of those age 65 or over.

References

External links
 Town of Iva official website
 Crescent High School Website
 Iva Elementary Website
 Flatrock Elementary Website

Towns in Anderson County, South Carolina
Towns in South Carolina